Zbýšov is a town in Brno-Country District in the South Moravian Region of the Czech Republic. It has about 3,700 inhabitants.

Geography
It lies on the border between the Křižanov Highlands and Boskovice Furrow.

History
The first written mention of Zbýšov is from 1280.

Notable people
Ivan Honl (1866–1936), bacteriologist and serologist

References

External links

Populated places in Brno-Country District
Cities and towns in the Czech Republic